The Network Inc. is a technology and services company that develops and delivers integrated GRC solutions designed to help organizations mitigate risk and promote organizational compliance. The Network's solutions are based on proprietary SaaS-based technology and expert-level services. The company uses the phrase "Protect, Detect, Correct" to describe how its solutions enable global enterprises and institutions manage risks posed by fraud and unethical conduct.

The Network current client base includes approximately 3,400 global organizations across a wide variety of industries and includes approximately half of the Fortune 500, representing almost 27 million employees worldwide.

History

The Network was founded in 1982 by Ralph Childs, a former FBI Special Agent, who implemented the first 24/7 anonymous reporting system to allow employees to bring unethical and illegal activities to their employers’ attention without fear of reprisal. Childs, then principal of security consulting firm Childs Associates, incorporated the new venture under the name National Business Crime Information Network, Inc., which soon became known by the shortened name, The Network. Soon thereafter, the company realized the need to make all employees more aware of organizational ethics programs and initiated a series of awareness and communications products (″Prevention SystemSM″), as well as ethics training materials to meet these requirements.

NetClaim

In the mid-1990s, The Network expanded its hotline reporting system to include claims reporting for worker compensation and other similar issues. The system it developed to manage claims reporting, NetClaim, remains a viable part of the company’s market mix.

Incident management

In 2005, the company developed its Case Management system (now known as Incident Management), which streamlined the incident and issue management process for corporate investigators and case managers. In May 2010, an enhanced version of the software was released as a replacement to the legacy system.

Product development

In 2011, the company expanded its existing ethics and compliance training offerings with interactive web-based training offerings, which cover topics such as codes of conduct, conflicts of interest, anti-corruption, discrimination and harassment, insider training, information security and ethics reporting. That same year, the company introduced an enhanced version of its platform-level Reporting & Analytics engine.

In April 2012, the company released its Policy Management solution, which enables organizations to use platform-level collaboration tools to create, distribute and manage company policies, track employee attestation, and know which version of a policy was in effect at any given time. In 2013, the company introduced a companion product to the Incident Management solution, CAPA/Remediation, designed to manage investigative follow-up and remedial tasks, as well as a Compliance Management solution designed for compliance risk assessment and employee survey management.

In February 2013, a research firm (GRC 20/20 Research) awarded a Technology Innovator Award to The Network for the company's Integrated GRC Suite, a SaaS-based GRC system designed to deliver seamless native integration of enterprise-level compliance data and provide visibility between incidents, cases, policies, courses, and corrective or preventative action plans. GRC 20/20's chief analyst, Michael Rasmussen, referred to the Integrated GRC Suite as the "Apple of GRC" for its "design and end user experience."

Compliance benchmarking

Annually since 2006, the company has released an annual Corporate Governance and Compliance Hotline Benchmarking Report, which provides a statistical study of fraud reporting trends across a range of industries and corporate demographics. The 2013 report revealed that incident reporting rates continued to climb and that 72 percent of participants did not notify management of an issue prior to submitting a hotline report.

Products

The company markets proprietary solutions which include:

 Integrated GRC Solutions Suite
 Policy Management – collaborative policy management
 Training & Communications – interactive ethics and compliance courses courseware
 Compliance Management - confidential phone- and web-based incident reporting (Hotline), proactive risk assessments and surveys
 Incident Management – centralized event and incident management
 CAPA/Remediation – corrective and preventative action planning, root cause analysis
 Reporting and Analytics – advanced analytics and data visualization engine
 Creative Services - awareness and communications programs
 Code of Conduct services – writing, design, refresh
 NetClaim® – claims reporting
 Professional Services – implementation, training and client support

Market and industry recognition

The Network has received design and writing awards for its awareness, training and communications, and code of conduct services, including:

 2008 Stevie Award Winner (American Business Awards) for Best Professional Education - Interactive Multimedia: "Ethics Idol - Episode 2: Hiring Family Members"
 2011 Stevie Award Finalist (American Business Awards) for Best Professional Education - Interactive Multimedia
 2012 IABC Gold Quill Award for Creative Communications
 2013 IAVA Communicator Silver Award of Distinction
 2013 Horizon Award

Affiliations

 Ethics and Compliance Officer Association (ECOA)
 Open Compliance & Ethics Group (OCEG) – Enterprise Member
 Society of Corporate Compliance and Ethics (SCCE)
 Society for Human Resource Management (SHRM) – Associate-level

References

American companies established in 1982
Technology companies of the United States
1982 establishments in the United States